Becque may refer to:

 Becque (river), the name of several rivers
 Henry Becque (1837–1899), French dramatist
 Réginald Becque (born 1972), French footballer
 Emile de Becque, a fictional character in South Pacific

See also 
 
 Bec (disambiguation)
Becq (disambiguation)
 Beek (disambiguation)
 DeBeque Formation, a geologic formation 
 De Beque, Colorado, a town in the U.S.